Yaz may refer to:

People
 Yazmith Bataz (born 1972), Mexican sprinter
 Yaz Mubarakai (born 1975), Australian politician
 Carl Yastrzemski (born 1939), American Hall-of-Fame baseball player
 Mike Yastrzemski (born 1990), American professional baseball player, grandson of Carl

Other uses
 Yaz culture, an early Iron Age culture of Bactria and Margiana, c. 1500-1100 BC
 Yaz-class river patrol craft, Russian Coast Guard vessels 
 YAZ, IATA code for Tofino Airport in Tofino, British Columbia, Canada
 yaz, ISO 639-3 code for the Yakö language, spoken by the Yakö people of Nigeria
 Yaz (band) or  Yazoo, an English synth-pop band
 Yaz Pistachio, a female character from the comic strip Bloom County
 Yaz (drug), a brand name for a birth control pill containing drospirenone that may also be used for other indications
 YAZ, a programmer toolkit for development of Z39.50 clients and servers

See also
 Yazz (born 1960), pseudonym used by English singer Yasmin Evans
 Yazz The Greatest, a stage name of American actor and rapper Bryshere Y. Gray

Lists of people by nickname